Carlos Edward Jenkins (born July 12, 1968) is a former American football linebacker in the National Football League (NFL). He played six seasons for the Minnesota Vikings (1991–1994) and the St. Louis Rams (1995–1996).

Career
Jenkins played for the Michigan State Spartans between 1987 and 1990. During his final two years at Michigan State, Jenkins made five interceptions, returning for an average of 7.0 yards per interception.

Jenkins was drafted to the Minnesota Vikings during the third round of the 1991 NFL Draft. In his rookie season with the Minnesota Vikings in 1991, Jenkins made one interception, returning it for the single touchdown of his career. During the 1993 NFL season, the Vikings' defensive coordinator, Tony Dungy, remarked that Jenkins was "on his way to becoming an outstanding outside linebacker".

In 1995, the St. Louis Rams signed Jenkins as a free agent to replace linebacker Joe Kelly. At the time, head coach Rich Brooks complimented Jenkins on his "youth, speed and NFL experience", characterizing him as a "big-play production guy and an impact hitter".

In 1997, Jenkins joined the San Francisco 49ers, but was waived.

Personal life
An only child, Jenkins was raised in Florida, where his mother worked for IBM.

In early 1993, while in Tampa, Florida, Jenkins suffered a motorcycle accident. According to Jenkins, he had been riding his Suzuki 1100 without a helmet at approximately seventy miles an hour when a displaced manhole cover caused him to fly off his motorcycle. The accident resulted in friction burns on fifteen percent of his body. "Things had been moving so fast and I lived fast," remarked Jenkins after the accident. "The accident brought everything to a halt."

References

1968 births
Living people
American football linebackers
Michigan State Spartans football players
Minnesota Vikings players
St. Louis Rams players
Sportspeople from Palm Beach, Florida
Players of American football from Florida